Merlito Sabillo (born January 19, 1984) is a Filipino professional boxer. He is a former WBO Minimumweight World Champion.

Professional career

Early years as professional boxer
In 2008, at the age of 24, Sabillo started his career as professional boxer. On, August 1, 2010, he won the Philippines Games and Amusement Board (GAB) strawweight title against Jetly Purisima via twelve round unanimous decision.

On October 8, 2011, Sabillo won the vacant OPBF Minimumweight Title against his landsman Rodel Tejares via twelve round unanimous decision.

Minimumweight division
On March 9, 2013, Sabillo defeated Colombia's Luis de la Rosa via 8-round technical knockout to win the interim WBO Minimumweight world title. He was later promoted to full champion after original champion Moises Fuentes vacated the title to move up to Light Flyweight. He successfully made his first title defence against Jorle Estrada on July 13, 2013. He retained his title for a second time against Nicaraguan Carlos Buitrago in a bout ending in a disputed split decision. In his next fight, Sabillo lost the title to Francisco Rodriguez, Jr. via tenth round TKO. On November 15, 2014 Merlito Sabillo lost to the hard-hitting Indonesian Journeyman Ellias Nggenggo. The fight turned into street brawl as the two fighters, throwing some wild punches and hard exchanges. In the end Merlito Sabillo come up short as the Indonesian visitor Ellias Nggenggo wins the bout.

On June 12, 2015, Sabillo defeated his fellow Filipino Countrymen Powell Balaba into a 6 round fighting contest that was held at the L' Fisher Hotel, La Proa Ballroom, Bacolod, Negros Occidental, Philippines. On November 29, 2015, he defeated the Indonesian Fighter Jack Amisa into a 6 round contest. On May 8, 2016, he face the Japanese Prospect Riku Kano at Bunka Center, Sanda, Hyōgo Prefecture for the interim OPBF Minimumweight title. In the earlier rounds, Merlito used his experience as he utilized his Left Straight Hand and Right Hook. Kano began to warm up with rounds 3 and 4 being much more competitive. Going at the last 4 rounds both men started to show the signs of fatigue at the ring. Kano was trying to pickup the fight and began to land shots while Sabillo lost his footwork and could not connect any of his punches to his opponent. Both men displayed their courage in the ring and they gave the audience a better fight. In the end Sabillo fell short and the much younger Japanese Prospect Riku Kano wins the bout and the OPBF Minimumweight title.

On November 11, 2016, the Former World Champion Merlito Sabillo was back to Japan for the second time as he faced the hard-hitting Japanese Professional Boxer Ryuya Yamanaka for the vacant OPBF Minimumweight title. Sabillo started well in the earlier rounds as he landed clean shots establishing his ground on the earlier bout. As the bout progressed Yamanaka built his confidence as he connected a body shot on Sabillo and landed some serious shots on him making Sabillo lost his ground and his defense as the fight proceeds. In the end Sabillo fell short and Yamanaka claim the OPBF Minimumweight title, making Sabillo, make his second lost in Japan.

Light flyweight division
On May 27, 2017 he defeated the Indonesian Fighter, Jack Amisa for a vacant Asian Boxing Federation Light Flyweight title. He successfully defend his Asian Boxing Federation Light Flyweight Title to his Filipino Countrymen Crison Omayao. On February 17, 2018 Merlito Sabillo lost to the undefeated Filipino Prospect Edward Heno to a 12-round fight for the unification of Oriental and Pacific Boxing Federation and Asian Boxing Federation Light Flyweight titles. On September 15, 2018 he fought the Chinese Fighter Jing Xiang for a vacant World Boxing Council Silver Light Flyweight title were he lost by unanimous decision.

Professional boxing record

Titles in boxing 
Major World Titles:
WBO Minimumweight Champion (105 lbs)
Minor World Titles:
OPBF Minimumweight title. (105 lbs)
ABF light flyweight Title (108 lbs)
Philippines Games & Amusement Board Minimumweight title. (105 lbs)

See also 
 List of WBO world champions
 List of Filipino boxing world champions

References

External links 
 

|-

|-

Living people
Boxers from Negros Occidental
1984 births
Mini-flyweight boxers
World mini-flyweight boxing champions
World Boxing Organization champions
Filipino male boxers